Dericorys  is the type genus of grasshoppers of the family Dericorythidae. Species have been recorded from Africa, the Iberian peninsula, Atlantic islands and western Asia.

Species 
The Orthoptera Species File lists:
Dericorys albidula Serville, 1838 - type species
Dericorys annulata Fieber, 1853
Dericorys carthagonovae Bolívar, 1897 - Iberian peninsula
Dericorys cyrtosterna Uvarov, 1933
Dericorys escalerai Bolívar, 1936
Dericorys guichardi Dirsh, 1950
Dericorys johnstoni Uvarov, 1933
Dericorys lobata Brullé, 1840
Dericorys millierei Bonnet & Finot, 1884
Dericorys minutus Chopard, 1954
Dericorys murati Uvarov, 1938
Dericorys philbyi Uvarov, 1933
Dericorys ramachandrai Uvarov, 1933
Dericorys tibialis Pallas, 1773
Dericorys uvarovi Ramme, 1930
Dericorys vitrea Bey-Bienko, 1957
Dericorys xenosterna Uvarov, 1933
Dericorys yemenita Ingrisch, 1999

References

External links 
 

Acrididae genera
Dericorythidae
Orthoptera of Europe
Orthoptera of Asia